Schepens is a Belgian or Dutch family name
Charles Schepens (1912-2006), Belgian ophtamologist
 (1853-1923), Belgian colonial pioneer in Villaguay (Argentina)
Gunther Schepens (*1973), Belgian football player
Julien Schepens (1935-2006), Belgian road bicycle racer
Niels Schepens  (1994), Belgian bowling athlete